Don't get above your raising may be:

 Don't get above your raisin', a Southern American colloquialism
 "Don't Get Above Your Raisin'", a 1951 song by Earl Scruggs, covered by Ricky Skaggs
 Don't Get Above Your Raisin': Country Music and the Southern Working Class, a 2001 by Bill C. Malone
 "Don't Get Above Your Raisin' (1984-2003)", episode 7 of Ken Burns's documentary Country Music

See also
Pretense (disambiguation)
Snobbery